Bushenyi District is a district in Western Uganda. Like many other Ugandan districts, it is named after its chief town, Bushenyi, where the district headquarters are located.

Location
Bushenyi District is bordered by Rubirizi District to the northwest, Buhweju District to the northeast, Sheema District to the east, Mitooma District to the south and Rukungiri District to the west. The coordinates of the district are:00 32S, 30 11E.

Overview
Prior to 2010, Bushenyi District is one of the most western of Uganda's districts, by location.

All that changed on 1 July 2010 when, by Act of Parliament, the old Bushenyi District was split into five new smaller districts, namely: (a) Buhweju District (b) Busheny District; new and smaller (c) Mitooma District (d) Rubirizi District and (e) Sheema District. The map shown above reflects the district before 2010. The district is part of the larger Ankole sub-region, consisting of nine districts, and home to an estimated 2.2 million Banyankole in 2002, according to the national census conducted at that time.

Population
In 1991, the national population census estimated the district population at about 161,000. In 2002, the district had a population of about 205,700, according to the national census bureau. The population growth rate in the district was calculated at 2%. It is estimated that the population of the district in 2012 was approximately 251,400.

Economic activities
Bushenyi District is fairly endowed with natural resources. The district has relatively low poverty levels among its residents. The economy of the district depends mainly on agriculture. Agriculture is a source of food for the population, subsistence income for most families and provides direct employment to 86.7% of the district population, as well as supplying raw materials to industries. The majority of the people are involved in subsistence agriculture with some engaged in commercial production of crops including:

Ranching for beef and dairy farming for milk production are widely practiced on both subsistence and commercial scales in Bushenyi District. Hybrid cattle are widely raised on farms in the district. The hybrids produce more milk per animal and yield more beef per carcass and therefore are more profitable than the local breeds.

Soil degradation, poor marketing and processing systems, and frequent out break of crop and livestock diseases are some of the challenges that the farmers in the district face.

See also

References

External links
 Bushenyi District Official website

 
Ankole sub-region
Districts of Uganda
Western Region, Uganda